John Sanday (born c.1960 in Tailevu) is a Fijian former rugby union player who played as a lock and number eight.

Career
In his club career he played for Suva in the national championship. His only international caps were in the 1987 Rugby World Cup, where he played two matches against Argentina and New Zealand.

Personal life
He is director of Melanesian Trustee Services Ltd., where he is a merchant banker with 40 years' experience in the industry and has had several ventures in Papua New Guinea, Australia and Fiji and runs a business consultancy company, providing consultancy in the resources sector mainly in fisheries, mining and oil and gas fields with landowner groups. He has now 4 children 2 girls (Alameida Sanday and Kalista Sanday) and 2 boys (Declan Sanday and John Sanday) and his wife Uda barbra Mea. 
He is uncle of Kirwan Sanday, an Australian-born rugby player who plays as prop for Australia and formerly for Fiji U20

Future
John has a various of upcoming new products as well as new company's. John is soon to release his new Kava Chews ($10 each) product around the world in early May or late April, also coming to the world his Kava drink and lollipop which is said to relax the body and relieve stress. This is already has been pre ordered (sold out). John is also busy trying to grow his company which is estimated by the end of this year will be around $800 million Kina which is converted to $250 million US dollars. John is undergoing his Kava farm with already 134 acres planted ready for harvest.

Notes

External links
John Sanday international statistics

Fiji international rugby union players
Fijian rugby union players
Rugby union locks
Rugby union number eights
People from Tailevu Province
1960 births
Living people
I-Taukei Fijian people